Players born on or after 1 January 1988 were eligible to participate in the tournament. Players' age as of 16 July 2007 – the tournament's opening day. Players in bold have later been capped at full international level.

Group A

Head coach:  Hermann Stadler

Head coach:  Nikos Nioplias

Head coach:  Edgar Borges

Head coach:  Juan Santisteban

Only 19 players in Spain squad.

Group B

Head coach:  Guy Ferrier

Head coach:  Frank Engel

Head coach:  Ravil Sabitov

Head coach:  Zvonko Živković

Footnotes

Squads
UEFA European Under-19 Championship squads